The 2019 No Surrender was a professional wrestling event produced by Impact Wrestling in conjunction with The Wrestling Revolver. It took place on December 7, 2019, at The Brightside Music & Event Venue in Dayton, Ohio. It was the 12th event under the No Surrender chronology and aired live exclusively on Impact Plus.

Production

Background
No Surrender was produced as a monthly pay-per-view event by Impact Wrestling (then known as Total Nonstop Action Wrestling (TNA)) between 2005 and 2012. No Surrender was dropped after the 2012 edition as part of a larger shift in the company's monthly pay-per-view strategy, in which Impact replaced live, monthly pay-per-view events with the pre-recorded One Night Only specials starting in 2013. No Surrender would be retained as a recurring special episode of Impact's flagship television program from 2013 to 2015. 

On November 12, 2019, Impact Wrestling announced No Surrender would be brought back as a monthly special to be aired exclusively on Impact Plus.

Storylines
On the November 5 episode of Impact!, the team of Daga, Rich Swann, Tessa Blanchard and Tommy Dreamer defeated oVe (Sami Callihan, Madman Fulton, Dave and Jake Crist) in an eight-man tag team match when Swann pinned Callihan. As a result of Swann's pinfall win over Callihan, Impact Wrestling announced on November 12 that Callihan would defend the Impact World Championship against Swann at No Surrender.

Eddie Edwards and Ace Austin had been feuding with each other over the past few months due to Austin stalking Edwards' wife Alisha Edwards. On November 12, it was announced that Edwards would face Austin in a Tables match at No Surrender.

Results

References

Impact Wrestling No Surrender
2019 in professional wrestling
2019 in Ohio
Events in Ohio
Professional wrestling in Dayton, Ohio
December 2019 events in the United States
2019 Impact Plus Monthly Special events
Events in Dayton, Ohio